Atrak Bojnourd Football Club is an Iranian football club based in Bojnourd, North Khorasan Province, Iran. They currently compete in the League 2.

Atrak Bojnord was founded in 2018 by Moghavemat Tehran Football Club by the Department of Sports and Youth of North Khorasan Province. This club was previously It was about to buy the points of Khoneh be Khoneh Babol football club, which changed the ownership of Khoneh be Khoneh and changed its name to Raika Babol and the team stayed in Mazandaran province, they turned to buying second league points.

Players

Current squad

Season-by-Season

The table below shows the achievements of the club in various competitions.

See also
 Hazfi Cup
 Iran Football's 3rd Division 2011–12

References 

Football clubs in Iran
Association football clubs established in 2005
2005 establishments in Iran